Travis Williams (born May 27, 1969) is an American former professional basketball player.

Born in Columbia, South Carolina, he attended South Carolina State University and signed with the Charlotte Hornets in 1997 where he played until 1999.

From 2000 to 2001, he played with Vertical Vision Cantu of the Italian league.

External links
NBA stats @ databasebasketball.com
NBA stats @ basketball-reference.com
Italian League statistics

1969 births
Living people
African-American basketball players
American expatriate basketball people in Argentina
American expatriate basketball people in China
American expatriate basketball people in Italy
American expatriate basketball people in Turkey
American men's basketball players
Basketball players at the 1999 Pan American Games
Basketball players from Columbia, South Carolina
Charlotte Hornets players
Florida Beachdogs players
Fort Wayne Fury players
Maratonistas de Coamo players
Oklahoma City Cavalry players
Pallacanestro Cantù players
Pan American Games medalists in basketball
Pan American Games silver medalists for the United States
Quad City Thunder players
Shanghai Sharks players
South Carolina State Bulldogs basketball players
Undrafted National Basketball Association players
Small forwards
Medalists at the 1999 Pan American Games
21st-century African-American people
20th-century African-American sportspeople